The 2019 Faroe Islands Cup was the 65th edition of Faroe Islands domestic football cup. It started on 30 March and ended with the final on 21 September. B36 Tórshavn were the defending champions, having won their sixth cup title the previous year, but lost to KÍ in the quarterfinals. As the winner of the competition, HB qualified to the preliminary round of the 2020–21 UEFA Europa League.

Only the first teams of the participating clubs were allowed to enter the competition.

Participating clubs

TH – Title Holders

Round and draw dates

Preliminary round

|}

First round

 

|}

Quarter-finals

|}

Semi-finals

|}

Final

Top goalscorers

References

Faroe Islands Cup seasons
2019 domestic association football cups
2019 in Faroe Islands football